Huancaitira (possibly from Quechua, possibly from wanqhay to throw down, t'ira twin) is a mountain in the Chila mountain range in the Andes of Peru, about  high. It is situated in the Arequipa Region, Caylloma Province, Tapay District. It lies northwest of Surihuiri.

References 

Mountains of Peru
Mountains of Arequipa Region